Lovescape is the nineteenth studio album by the American singer Neil Diamond. Released in 1991, it peaked at number 44 on the Billboard 200. "Hooked on the Memory of You" was a duet with Kim Carnes, while "Don't Turn Around" was co-written by Diane Warren. It is the last album, till 12 Songs, to credit him with playing guitar, but he may have possibly contributed some uncredited guitar work on previous or subsequent albums.

Track listing

Personnel 
 Neil Diamond – lead vocals, acoustic guitar (1, 2, 4, 6, 8-12, 14), arrangements (11)
 Tom Hensley – keyboards (1, 2, 4, 6, 8, 10-15), arrangements (1, 2, 6, 8, 14)
 Alan Lindgren – keyboards (1, 2, 4, 6, 8, 10-15), arrangements (1, 2, 4, 6, 8, 10, 12, 13, 15), original concept arrangement (7)
  Simon Franglen – programming (2)
 Randy Kerber – keyboards (3)
 Robbie Buchanan – keyboards (3, 5), arrangements (3), acoustic piano (7)
 Claude Gaudette – keyboards (4)
 Jimmy Johnson – acoustic piano (7)
 Larry Knechtel – acoustic piano (9)
 Benmont Tench – organ (9)
 Doug Rhone – guitar (1, 2, 4, 6, 8, 10-15), backing vocals (2, 6, 11, 13), arrangements (11)
 Hadley Hockensmith – guitar (1, 2, 4, 6, 10-15)
 Rusty Anderson – guitar (3)
 Michael Thompson – guitar (3, 4)
 Andrew Gold – guitar (5)
 Bob Mann – guitar (5)
 Dan Dugmore – pedal steel guitar (5)
 Mark Goldenberg – guitar (9)
 Reinie Press – bass (1, 2, 4, 6, 8, 10-15)
 Leland Sklar – bass (3)
 Bob Glaub – bass (5)
 Bob Magnusson – electric bass (7)
 Tim Drummond – bass (9)
 Ron Tutt – drums (1, 2, 4, 6, 8, 10-15), backing vocals (2, 6, 11, 13)
 Carlos Vega – drums (3, 5, 7), acoustic bass (7)
 Kenny Aronoff – drums (9)
 Vince Charles – percussion (1, 2, 4, 6, 8, 10-15)
 King Errisson – congas  (1, 2, 4, 6, 8, 10-15)
 Peter Asher – tambourine (5), BGV arrangement (5)
 Assa Drori – concertmaster (2, 6, 10, 12, 15)
 Gavyn Wright – concertmaster (5, 7)
 Linda Press – backing vocals (2, 6, 11, 13)
 Jean McClain – backing vocals (3)
 Joe Turano – backing vocals (3)
 Terry Wood – backing vocals (3, 5)
 Susan Boyd – backing vocals (5)
 Valerie Carter – backing vocals (5)
 Wendy Fraser – backing vocals (5)
 Raven Kane – backing vocals (5)
 Kate Markowitz – backing vocals (5)
 Andrea Robinson – backing vocals (5)
 Stephanie Spruill – backing vocals (5)
 Carmen Twillie – backing vocals (5)
 David Campbell – backing vocals (5, 7), BGV arrangement (5)
 Kim Carnes – lead and backing vocals (8)
 Hilliard Atkinson – backing vocals (9)
 Harry Bowens – backing vocals (9)
 Sally Dworsky – backing vocals (9)
 Arnold McCuller – backing vocals (9)

Production
 Producers – Val Garay (Tracks 1-8); Neil Diamond (Tracks 2, 6 & 10-15); Albert Hammond (Track 3); Humberto Gatica (Track 4); Peter Asher (Tracks 5 & 7); Don Was (Track 9).
 Production Coordinator – Sam Cole
 Recording Engineers – Val Garay (Tracks 1-8); Larry Brown (Track 2); Bernie Becker (Tracks 2, 6 & 10-15); Darren Klein (Track 3); Frank Wolf (Tracks 5 & 7); Ed Cherney (Track 9).
 Assistant Engineers – Dan Bosworth, Guy DeFazio, Brad Eldridge, Matthew Gruber, Nathaniel Kunkel and Brett Swain.
 Recorded at Record One, Arch Angel Studios, Ocean Way Recording, Westlake Studios and Lion Share Recording (Los Angeles, CA); Abbey Road Studios (London, England).
 Overdubbed at Arch Angel Studios, 440 Sound Recorders, Ground Control Studios, Studio F and The Hop (Los Angeles, CA); Evergreen Studios (Burbank, CA).
 Mix Engineers – Val Garay (Tracks 1-8); Humberto Gatica (Tracks 2, 3, 4, 6 & 10-15); Frank Wolf (Tracks 5 & 7); Ed Cherney (Track 9).
 Assistant Mixing – Alejandro Rodriguez
 Mixed at Record One, Ground Control Studios and Record Plant (Los Angeles, CA); Conway Studios (Hollywood, CA); Encore Studios (Burbank, CA).
 Mastered by George Marino at Sterling Sound, NYC.
 Art Direction and Design – David Kirschner
 Additional Design – Jan Weinberg
 Photography – Matthew Rolston

Certifications

References

Neil Diamond albums
1991 albums
Albums arranged by David Campbell (composer)
Albums produced by Don Was
Albums produced by Peter Asher
albums produced by Val Garay
Columbia Records albums